Tai Hang is an area in the Tai Po District of Hong Kong.

The area encompasses several villages, including Tsz Tong Tsuen and the two walled villages of Chung Sum Wai and Fui Sha Wai.

Administration
Tai Hang is a recognized village under the New Territories Small House Policy. It is one of the villages represented within the Tai Po Rural Committee. For electoral purposes, Tai Hang is part of the Lam Tsuen Valley constituency, which is currently represented by Richard Chan Chun-chit.

History 
The villagers of the Tai Hang Village were mainly the members of the Man clan. The original members of the Man clan in Tai Hang were relatives of Wen Tianxiang, the Duke and scholar-general of the Song Dynasty in China. When the Mongols invaded the Song Dynasty, Wen fled to the South with his family and the Emperor of the Song Dynasty. At first, the family of Wen stayed in Dongguan but they then moved to the present-day New Territories of Hong Kong. Because of the historic background, Wen Tianxiang is commemorated in the village through his statue and an inscription of one of his writings.

At the time of the 1911 census, the population of Tai Hang Tsz Tong Tsuen was 77. The number of males was 29.

Features 
 Tai Hang Village is formed by the "Two Wai One Village", which consists of two walled villages, Chung Sum Wai and Fui Sha Wai, and the village of Tsz Tong Tsuen. The enclosing walls of Fui Sha Wai have been listed as Grade III historic buildings.
 It contains the largest number of traditional village schools in the Tai Po District. For example, the "藝沅學校", "善慶書室", "叢桂書室" and "正倫書室" were built in the Qing Dynasty and their remains still exist in the village.
 Three old temples in the village, Guanyin Temple, Tin Hau Temple and the Man Tai Temple, were built in the Qing Dynasty and several relics are still kept in the temples. 
 The old trees outside the temples formed a double trunk and hid the sculpture of the god of marriage between them. It shows the linkage between the gods and hidden messages of the double trunk, the inseparable love.
 The sculpture of Wen Tianxiang and the inscription of his literature in the Man Shan Park.

Festival
The traditional festival of the village, Da Jiu Festival, is held every five years. It started after building the village in order to express the thanks towards the gods and to beg for the fortune. The latest Da Jiu Festival was held in 2020.

See also
 San Tin, another area of Hong Kong settled by members of the Man clan

References

External links

 Delineation of area of existing village Tai Hang (Tai Po) for election of resident representative (2019 to 2022)
 Antiquities Advisory Board. Historic Building Appraisal. Ngai Yuen Tong, Tai Hang Pictures
 Antiquities Advisory Board. Historic Building Appraisal. Man Ancestral Hall, Tsz Tong Tsuen Pictures
 Antiquities Advisory Board. Historic Building Appraisal. Tin Hau Temple & Man Tai Temple, Tsz Tong Tsuen Pictures
 Antiquities Advisory Board. Historic Building Appraisal. Sin Hing Study Hall, Tsz Tong Tsuen Pictures

Areas of Hong Kong
Tai Po District